Ketalem and Sadat Shahr is a city in the Central District of Ramsar County, Mazandaran Province, Iran.  At the 2006 census, its population was 17,900, in 5,234 families.

The city was formed by the merger of two existing settlements: Ketalem (Persian: كتالم, also Romanized as Ketālem and Katālem) and Sadat Mahalleh (Persian: سادات مَحَلِّه, also Romanized as Sādāt Maḩalleh, and also known as Sādāt Maḩalleh-ye Sakht Sar).

References

Populated places in Ramsar County

Cities in Mazandaran Province